Wazi may refer to:

Wazi campaign, nationwide public awareness campaign that used 3-D animation to convey messages of peace and good governance in Kenya
Wazi Abdul Hamid (born 1971), Malaysian motorcycle cub prix rider
Camp Waziyatah, summer camp in Waterford, 50 miles from Portland, Maine, United States
WAZI (Wisconsin), a defunct radio station on 1370 AM in Sussex, Wisconsin.